Armageddon – Les Effets Speciaux was an attraction located in Walt Disney Studios Park at Disneyland Paris. The attraction opened on March 16, 2002 with the park. It was based on the 1998 Touchstone film Armageddon, which was produced by Jerry Bruckheimer and directed by Michael Bay. The principle was to demonstrate set effects, as in the film, within a full room using special effects.

The ride closed on March 31, 2019, and the showbuilding will later be demolished for the Avengers Campus expansion to the 'Walt Disney Studios Park', as announced by Bob Iger in February 2018.

History
On September 29, 1999, Disney announced that a new theme park would be built right next to Disneyland Paris. It would be named Walt Disney Studios Park and be themed to movies. The park would feature various attractions, including Rock 'n' Roller Coaster Starring Aerosmith and Armageddon – Les Effets Speciaux. Themed to the 1998 film, Armageddon, it would be a special effects attraction similar to Twister...Ride it Out at Universal Studios Florida. Construction of the attraction began in 2000 with the rest of the park.

Armageddon – Les Effets Speciaux opened on time with Walt Disney Studios Park on March 16, 2002.

On December 10, 2018, Walt Disney Studios Paris announced that the last day for Armageddon – Les Effets Speciaux would occur on March 31, 2019. That same day, the park announced that the Backlot area would be transformed into Avengers Campus. On the final day of operation, a closing ceremony was held exclusively for Infinity Annual passholders.

Attraction summary

Queue and pre-show
Guests entered studio 7-A or studio 7-B, where the attraction took place. In the queue, guests walked through a switchback section with actor posters. The Armadillo vehicle could be spotted in the area. At the end of the queue, guests waited outside for the doors to open. Guests then walked into the building, where a Cast Member explained the part they are about to play in the shooting. A pre-show presentation included a short history of special effects with several clips from various blockbuster films, such as Return of the Jedi, Star Wars: Episode I – The Phantom Menace, Independence Day, Dinosaur, The Abyss, Honey, I Blew Up the Kid, Inspector Gadget and Georges Méliès' films. After this, Michael Clarke Duncan ("Bear" in the movie) would give guests a speech. They learned they will enter the recreation of the modified Mir from the film. Two main characters will join them: the central computer of the Station and Colonel Andropov. The films and spiel of both studios were identical, although they have different art work on display.

Main show
After the pre-show, guests walked through a hallway that led to a round chamber, where the main show took place. It resembled the set of the Station's main deck. As the show started with the director's call of "Action", several scenes ensued. Windows opening either on Space or on Earth let guests witness the arrival of a meteorite rain. As it hit the station, several dysfunctions occurred, including lights flickering, gas bursting into the cabin, the ceiling threatening to collapse and incandescent rocks crossing the room. At one point, the build-up of pressure in the pipes caused a part of the wall to be pulled out, letting air escape until a tight door closed. Finally, as guests could see the main meteor arriving on them, a powerful explosion occurs and lights go out. A voice calling "Cut!" closes the show. On the way out, guests can spot some props.

The whole attraction lasted about 22 minutes with a capacity of about 170 people.

See also
 Backdraft (attraction)

References

External links
 Official Site for Attraction-Disneyland Paris.com
 Photos Magiques - Armageddon: Les Effets Spéciaux
 DLRP Magic - Armageddon: Les Effets Spéciaux

Amusement rides introduced in 2002
Amusement rides that closed in 2019
Former Walt Disney Parks and Resorts attractions
Walt Disney Studios Park
Backlot (Walt Disney Studios Park)
Amusement rides based on film franchises
2002 establishments in France
2019 disestablishments in France